Hexacyclonate (Gevilon) is a stimulant drug. It has been used for the treatment of alcoholism and for increasing motivation in elderly patients, but is now mainly used for the treatment of hyperlipoproteinaemia. It is chemically similar to the anticonvulsant gabapentin, with a hydroxyl group replacing the amine.

The latter use may be incorrectly assigned, as "Gevilon" has been used as a trade name for gemfibrozil, a well-known drug for dislypidemia.

References 

Stimulants
Primary alcohols